Varthur is a suburb situated in the Eastern periphery of Bangalore City and part of the internationally famous Whitefield township. Varthur is a Hobli and part of the Bruhat Bangalore Mahanagara Palike. Varthur was a Legislative Assembly in the state of Karnataka but was split into three legislative assemblies C.V.Raman Nagar, Mahadevapura and Krishnarajapura in the year 2008. It is also one of the wards of BBMP. It is located in South-Eastern Bangalore between old Airport road and Sarjapur road. Varthur is very close to ITPB.

There are many IT companies in Varthur Hobli. The head office of one of the largest IT companies, Wipro Technologies is situated at Doddakannelli, Varthur Hobli. Some other companies such as Cisco Systems, ARM, and Aricent Group, are situated in Varthur Hobli.

At Varthur, people celebrate Brahmarathotsava of Sri Chennaraya Swamy, which happens on the day of Ratha Saptami. It is one of the famous events that takes place in this area. Two days later is Karaga of Sri Draupathamma (Draupadi) at Sri Dharmaraya Swamy (Yudhishthira) temple, which happens at night and is visited by thousands of people from Varthur, Gunjur, Madhuranagara, Whitefield, Ramagondannahalli, Balagere, Sorahunase, Immadihalli, Harohalli, Muthsandra, and Kotur.

Geography 
The Ponnaiyar flows through Varthur.

Administration
MP Constituency : Bangalore Central
MLA Constituency : Mahadevapura
BBMP Ward : Varthur
MP  : P C Mohan (Bharatiya Janata Party (BJP))
MLA : Aravinda Limbavali (BJP)
Councilor: Pushpa Manjunath (BJP)

Educational institutions 

New Horizon College of Engineering
CMR Institute of Technology
Pratham International School, Varthur
Krupanidhi Nursing pharmacy degree and PU College, Gunjur
Government Degree College, Varthur
Government High School and Junior College, Varthur
Government Middle School, Varthur
Jnana sagar vidya mandir school, Varthur
Sri Sharadha Vidhya Mandir, Varthur
Ryan International
K K Education Society
Vagdevi Vilas School (at Varthur and Marathahalli)
Lady Vailankanni Group of Institutions
Chrysalis High, Gunjur
Sri Ravishankar Vidya Mandir
Vibgyor High School, Marathahalli
Chrysalis High School In, Varthur, Gunjur Main Road
Vahe Global Academy, Varthur, Gunjur
Deen's Academy, in whitefield ECC Road
Global Indian International School, near Dommasandra Circle
Greenwood High near Dommasandra Circle
TISB International School near Dommasandra Circle
Inventure Academy near Dommasandra Circle
Oakridge International School near Dommasandra Circle
Indus International School in Dommasandra Circle
Abhijatha Education Society (SLF Convent)

Varthur Main Road 
The stretch starting from HAL old Airport road till Varthur via Marathahalli, Kundalahalli, Thubarahalli, Siddhapura, Ramagondanahalli, and Varthur Kodi is officially known as Varthur Main Road.

Varthur lake 

The lake ecosystem is an integral part of Bangalore, although unplanned urbanisation and industrialisation have led to the contamination of these water bodies. Its ecosystem is under continuous degradation because of sewage water from Bangalore entering the lake from Bellandur Lake, further upstream.

This is a man-made lake, built by the Ganga kings thousands of years ago for agriculture and domestic uses but now the lake is receiving 40% of the sewage water from Bangalore for over 50 years resulting in eutrophication.

Gallery

References 

Neighbourhoods in Bangalore